The 2019–20 Polish Cup was the sixty-sixth season of the annual Polish football knockout tournament. It began on 7 August 2019 with the first matches of the preliminary round and ended with the final at Arena Lublin. The 2019–20 edition of the Polish Cup was sponsored by Totolotek, making the official name Totolotek Puchar Polski. Winners of the competition qualified for the qualifying round of the 2020–21 UEFA Europa League.

Participating teams

Prize money
The PZPN Board of Directors determined the size of the prizes at its meeting on April 24, 2019.

Round and draw dates

Preliminary round

! colspan="3" style="background:cornsilk;"|6 August 2019

|-
! colspan="3" style="background:cornsilk;"|7 August 2019

|-
! colspan="3" style="background:cornsilk;"|No match

|}

Round of 64 
The draw for this round was conducted in the headquarter of PZPN on 20 August 2019. The matches will played on 24 to 26 September 2019. Participating in this round were the 4 winners from the previous round, 16 teams from the 2018–19 Ekstraklasa, 18 teams from the 2018–19 I liga, 10 highest ranked teams from 2018 to 2019 II liga and 16 winners of the regional cup competitions. Games were hosted by teams playing in the lower division in the 2019–20 season.

! colspan="3" style="background:cornsilk;"|24 September 2019

|-
! colspan="3" style="background:cornsilk;"|25 September 2019

|-
! colspan="3" style="background:cornsilk;"|26 September 2019

|}

Bracket

Round of 32 

! colspan="3" style="background:cornsilk;"|29 October 2019

|-
! colspan="3" style="background:cornsilk;"|30 October 2019

|-
! colspan="3" style="background:cornsilk;"|31 October 2019

|-
|}

Round of 16 

! colspan="3" style="background:cornsilk;"|3 December 2019

|-
! colspan="3" style="background:cornsilk;"|4 December 2019

|-
! colspan="3" style="background:cornsilk;"|5 December 2019

|}

Quarter-finals

! colspan="3" style="background:cornsilk;"|10 March 2020

|-
! colspan="3" style="background:cornsilk;"|11 March 2020

|-
! colspan="3" style="background:cornsilk;"|26 May 2020

|-
! colspan="3" style="background:cornsilk;"|27 May 2020

|}

Semi-finals

! colspan="3" style="background:cornsilk;"|7 July 2020

|-
! colspan="3" style="background:cornsilk;"|8 July 2020

|}

Final

Notes

References

Polish Cup
Cup
Polish Cup seasons
Poland